Unite the Right may refer to:

 Unite the Right (Canada), a 1996–2003 Canadian political movement that led to the creation of the Conservative Party
 Unite the Right rally, a 2017 white supremacist rally in Charlottesville, Virginia
 Unite the Right 2, a 2018 white supremacist rally in Washington, DC